Alexander Cox may refer to:

 Alexander Cox (cricketer)
 Alexander Cox (field hockey)
 Alex Cox, an English film director